John Leslie Garrett (born 6 January 1963) is a male British former international rower.

Rowing career
Garrett represented Great Britain at the 1984, 1988 and 1992 Summer Olympics.  He rowed for Cambridge in the 1984 and 1985 Boat Races.  He has umpired The Boat Race on numerous occasions, including 2008, 2012, and the 2018 men's race. He represented England and won a silver medal in the eight, at the 1986 Commonwealth Games in Edinburgh, Scotland.

Life
Garrett was born in Radley, Oxfordshire.  He was educated at Shrewsbury, where he won Henley with the boat club twice, and at St John's College, Cambridge, where he rowed for the Lady Margaret Boat Club before progressing to the Cambridge boat.

Politics
Garrett stood as the Labour Party candidate in Fylde at the 1997 General Election, where he came in second place with 31.65 per cent of the vote. He is not to be confused with John Laurence Garrett, who stood down as the Labour MP for Norwich South that same year.

References

1963 births
Living people
Rowers at the 1984 Summer Olympics
Rowers at the 1988 Summer Olympics
Rowers at the 1992 Summer Olympics
Alumni of St John's College, Cambridge
Sportspeople from Oxfordshire
English male rowers
Olympic rowers of Great Britain
Commonwealth Games medallists in rowing
Commonwealth Games silver medallists for England
Rowers at the 1986 Commonwealth Games
Medallists at the 1986 Commonwealth Games